Tauris is a name for the Crimea. It may refer to:

 Taurica or Tauric Peninsula, ancient Greek names for the Crimea
 Iphigenia in Tauris, ancient Greek play by Euripides
 Iphigenia in Tauris (Goethe), a reworking of the Euripides' play by Johann Wolfgang von Goethe

It may also refer to:
 Tauris, ancient name for Tabriz, Iran
 814 Tauris, minor planet orbiting the Sun
 I.B. Tauris, independent publishing house with offices in London and New York

See also
Tauri, an ancient people settled on the southern coast of the Crimean peninsula
Taurida (disambiguation)
Tauros (disambiguation)
Taurus (disambiguation)